The 2017 Qatar Cup, more widely known as the Crown Prince Cup, was the twenty-third edition of the Qatar Cup. It was played from April 26–29. The cup is contested by the top four finishers of the 2016–17 Qatar Stars League.

Participants

Matches

Semi-finals

Finals

Bracket

Top scorers

References

Qatar Crown Prince Cup
Qatar Cup
Qatar Cup